Patricia Hughes was a member of Philadelphia City Council representing the 7th District and was Democratic Leader of the 7th Ward.

References

Living people
Year of birth missing (living people)
Philadelphia City Council members
Pennsylvania Democrats
Women city councillors in Pennsylvania
21st-century American women